"Right by My Side" is a song by Trinidadian-American rapper and singer Nicki Minaj, taken from her second studio album, Pink Friday: Roman Reloaded (2012). The song also features additional vocals from R&B artist Chris Brown. "Right by My Side" was written by Ester Dean and Minaj, while production was handled by Pop & Oak. On March 27, 2012, "Right by My Side" was released as the second official single from the album to Rhythmic and Urban radio in the U.S.

Musically, "Right by My Side" is an upbeat ballad infused with elements of pop. It was compared to several other songs, including Jordin Sparks "No Air", in which Brown was featured on, Rihanna's "You da One", and even Minaj's own track "Right Thru Me". Critics noted the songs "bubbly" persona, as well as its high quality production. Minaj performed the song live for the first time on 106 & Park on April 3, 2012. Minaj also performed the single during her surprise appearance at the Nokia Lumia 900 launch in Times Square.

Background and composition

In an interview with Ryan Seacrest, Minaj said about the song: "Toward the end of the album I wanted something more melodic that I could give to urban radio and that pop radio could enjoy as well. I actually had the beats for like 3 months just sitting in my computer and then I said, 'You know what? This sounds like a summer, R&B classic joint' and I just could not hear anyone else on it but Chris Brown. So I reached out to Ester Dean and I said, 'Could you write something for Chris Brown?' Because she's amazing with writing and especially for his voice, she has a great skill to write for his tone and she sent it, I fell in love with it, you know 'cause everybody has had a relationship like this song is talking about, [so] I went in and I wrote my rap, cause I'm rapping and singing in the song, and when we put it all together and let people hear it, everybody was like, this is a hit, release this ASAP."
 
"Right by My Side" is an upbeat take on a downtempo ballad. The song is also heavily influenced by pop, and features a "glossy", "bubbly" production. Some critics found similarities between "Right by My Side" and other songs by fellow female R&B artists, specifically Jordin Sparks and Rihanna. Both Justin Ray of Billboard, Andrew Hampp of Billboard, and Robbie Daw of Idolator found the lyrics and themes similar to those of Sparks 2008 single "No Air" which also featured Brown, Andrew Unterberger of Popdust felt the song was a more successful version of Rihanna's "You da One".

Critical reception
Andrew Hampp of Billboard said the song sounded "sonically similar to Jordin Sparks and Brown's 'No Air'", and complimented Minaj for letting her guard down. Jesal Padania of Rap Reviews criticized the song for being weak, as well as commenting on the choice to release it as a single, saying "I guess they choose star power over star quality." Andrew Martin of Prefix Magazine was disappointed that the song featured almost no rapping, and called it another "soft-as-hell ballad". In a separate article, Justin Ray of Billboard gave a positive review of the song, and praised Brown's verse.

Chart performance
Upon being released, "Right by My Side" entered the US Hot R&B/Hip-Hop Songs chart at 52 in its opening week, and peaked at 21 on the chart. "Right by My Side" debuted and peaked at 51 in the Billboard Hot 100. The song also peaked at number 70 on the UK Singles Chart on the week ending June 17, 2012.

Music video
Filming for the music video began on April 28, 2012 and ended the next morning. It features Nas as Nicki Minaj's love interest. In the video Minaj dons a blonde wig. The video consists mainly of the duo enjoying each other's company, featuring scenes such as the two of them going shopping, holding hands, hugging, or Nicki jumping into Nas' arms in joy. There are also cut away scenes of Chris Brown singing, Nicki Minaj and Chris Brown singing together against a grey background and Nas looking stressed as Nicki raps about arguing. The music video, which was directed by Benny Boom, was released on May 16, 2012.

Live performances
Minaj performed "Right by My Side" live for the first time on April 3, 2012, on 106 & Park, along with "Beez in the Trap", "Roman Reloaded", "HOV Lane", "I Am Your Leader", "Champion", and "Fire Burns". She also surprised fans by performing the single for the launch of Nokia Lumia 900 in Times Square on April 6, 2012. Minaj performed the song in a mash-up with "Starships" on The Ellen DeGeneres Show on May 10, 2012. Minaj performed "Right by My Side" live during Radio 1's Hackney Weekend on June 23, 2012, as part of the line-up on the main stage.

Charts

Year-end charts

Radio release history

References

	

2012 songs
Nicki Minaj songs
Chris Brown songs
Cash Money Records singles
Songs written by Nicki Minaj
Contemporary R&B ballads
Pop ballads
Music videos directed by Benny Boom
Songs written by Pop Wansel
Songs written by Ester Dean
Songs written by Oak Felder
2010s ballads